Frédéric Lodéon (born 26 January 1952 in the 14th arrondissement of Paris) is a contemporary French cellist, conductor and radio personality.

Biography 
In 1960, his father, André Lodéon, was appointed director of the School of Music of Saint-Omer (Pas-de-Calais). It was there that the young Frédéric began learning music with the cellist Albert Tétard.

Frédéric Lodéon received the first prize of cello at the Conservatoire de Paris in 1969 (awarded unanimously by the jury). In 1977, he won ex-aequo the first Mstislav Rostropovich competition. He is the only Frenchman to have won it.

Thereafter, he directed several orchestras, among which the Orchestre philharmonique de Radio France, the Orchestre du Capitole de Toulouse, and the Orchestre National Bordeaux Aquitaine.

At the beginning of the 1990s, he presented on France 3 the program Musiques, Maestro ! which wants to make the Orchestre de Paris, the Orchestre National Bordeaux-Aquitaine or the l'Orchestre National de Lyon known to a very large audience.

He became famous to the general public by his programs on France Inter, for which he animated Carrefour de Lodéon from 1992, as well as Les grands concerts de Radio France. His cheerful tone and his erudition earned him continued success. He also presented the Victoires de la musique classique on France 3. In June 2014, his broadcasts are removed from France Inter but Carrefour de Lodéon is aired on France Musique.

In 2015, he became the godfather of music festival of Saint-Malo "Classique au large".

Frédéric Lodéon is chevalier of the Légion d'honneur and officier of the Ordre des Arts et des Lettres.

Selected discography 
 Cello concertos by Vivaldi with Jean-François Paillard
 Cello concertos by Haydn
 Cello concertos by Boccherini
 Cello concertos by Robert Schumann
 Cello concerto by Lalo
 Schumann's Complete Chamber Music (with Jean Hubeau, Jean Moullière, the Via Nova Quartet (Erato Records)
 L’Épiphanie by André Caplet (Grand Prix of the Académie Charles-Cros)
 Sonatas by Schubert, Shostakovich, Prokofiev
 Trios by Schubert, Ravel
 Trio Op 50 by Tchaikovsky (Grand Prix of the Académie du disque français)
 Chamber music by Fauré
 Carmen, suites n° 1 & 2 ; Symphony n°1 in C major, by Georges Bizet (directed by the Orchestre National Bordeaux Aquitaine)

Distinctions 
 Chevalier of the Légion d'honneur, 2001
 Prix Richelieu 2007
 Commander of the Ordre des Arts et des Lettres, 2019

References

External links 
 Frédéric Lodéon, animateur miélomane on Télérama
 Frédéric Lodéon : Je suis peut-être un descendant d'Alexandre Dumas on France Info
  Frédéric Lodéon's biography on Valmalette
 Carrefour de Lodéon sur France Inter
 Les grands concerts de Radio France sur France Inter
 Plaisir d'amour sur France Musique
 Festival Bach en Drôme
 Beethoven Triple Concerto Movt 2-3 Part 3 on YouTube

1952 births
Living people
French male conductors (music)
French classical cellists
Chevaliers of the Légion d'honneur
Commandeurs of the Ordre des Arts et des Lettres
French radio presenters
Musicians from Paris
21st-century French conductors (music)
21st-century French male musicians
21st-century cellists